Randy Stuart Turner (born December 27, 1991) is an American former professional baseball catcher. He played in Major League Baseball (MLB) for the Cincinnati Reds in 2017. Prior to playing professionally, he played college baseball for the Ole Miss Rebels and won the Johnny Bench Award.

Career
Turner is from Eunice, Louisiana. After he graduated from Eunice High School, he enrolled at Louisiana State University at Eunice. He transferred to the University of Mississippi (Ole Miss), where he played college baseball for the Ole Miss Rebels baseball team. In 2013, he won a Gold Glove Award from the American Baseball Coaches Association and the Johnny Bench Award, given annually to best catcher in the National Collegiate Athletic Association's Division I.

Minnesota Twins
The Minnesota Twins selected Turner in the third round of the 2013 Major League Baseball Draft. He signed with the Twins, and played for the Elizabethton Twins of the Rookie-level Appalachian League. The Twins invited him to spring training in 2014, and assigned him to the Fort Myers Miracle of the Class A-Advanced Florida State League. In 2015, he played for the Chattanooga Lookouts of the Class AA Southern League, where he posted a .223 batting average with four home runs and 37 RBIs. Turner returned to the Lookouts in 2016, where he batted .239 with six home runs and 41 RBIs.

Cincinnati Reds
During the 2016 Winter Meetings, the Cincinnati Reds selected Turner from the Twins in the Rule 5 draft. Turner made the Reds' Opening Day roster in 2017 and made his major league debut on April 6. On August 11, 2017, he hit his first Major League home run off of San Diego Padres pitcher Travis Wood. The Reds optioned Turner to the minor leagues at the end of spring training in 2018. He was designated for assignment on March 31, 2018. He was outrighted to AAA Louisville Bats on April 4. He was released on March 27, 2019. He resigned a minor league deal on April 18, 2019. Turner elected free agency after the season on November 4.

Personal life
Turner has two brothers. He was diagnosed with diabetes mellitus type 1 while he was in the seventh grade.

Turner and his wife, Danielle, had their first child, son Easton Michael, in August 2017.

See also
Rule 5 draft results

References

External links

1991 births
Living people
People from Eunice, Louisiana
Baseball players from Louisiana
Major League Baseball catchers
Cincinnati Reds players
LSU Eunice Bengals baseball players
Ole Miss Rebels baseball players
Elizabethton Twins players
New Britain Rock Cats players
Scottsdale Scorpions players
Fort Myers Miracle players
Arizona League Reds players
Chattanooga Lookouts players
Louisville Bats players